The Human Connection is the second studio album Australian progressive metal band Chaos Divine. It was released on 25 March 2011 through Firestarter Music & Distribution.

Track listing

Personnel
Chaos Divine
David Anderton - Vocals
Ryan Felton - Guitar, keyboards, sampling, artwork
Simon Mitchell - Guitar, engineering
Michael Kruit - Bass guitar
Ben Mazzarol - Drums

Additional personnel
Jens Bogren - Mixing, mastering
Troy Nababan - Assistant engineering
James Hewgill - Additional post-production

References

2011 albums